Meagan Best (born 26 April 2002) is an accomplished Barbadian female squash player. She is currently considered as the leading squash player to represent Barbados at international level. Her highest career ranking was 208 in January 2018 and is currently ranked 243 as of April 2018.

Career 
She rose to prominence in her squash career after winning the Girl's U17 category at the US Junior Open squash championship in 2017. Meagan also became the first squash player from a Caribbean nation to win a US Junior Open squash championship title.

Meagan Best was also named as one of the members of the Barbados contingent for the 2018 Commonwealth Games just at the age of fifteen and she was also the flagbearer for Barbados at the 2018 Commonwealth Games during the opening ceremony of the 2018 Commonwealth Games Parade of Nations. She was scheduled to compete in the women's singles and mixed doubles events at the Gold Coast Commonwealth Games.

She also went onto quality for the plate final event at the women's singles event during the Gold Coast Commonwealth Games. Meagan also became the first Barbadian squash player to qualify for final round of an international squash tournament. In the plate final of the women's singles during the 2018 Commonwealth Games she defeated Mihiliya Methsarani of Sri Lanka 3-1 to secure the plate title.

References 

2002 births
Barbadian female squash players
Squash players at the 2018 Commonwealth Games
Commonwealth Games competitors for Barbados
Sportspeople from Bridgetown
Living people